Knowledge management is a multidisciplinary business model that seeks to explore and provide models and concepts. Knowledge management has its roots in many disciplines, such as business, economics, psychology, and information management. The goal of knowledge management is to promote the achievement of organizations' goals, competitiveness and competitive advantage through long-term processes by utilizing the intangible capital of companies and organizations (personnel, know-how, technology, customers, networks, etc.).  In modern times, social media in particular has grown and become more widespread as part of corporate business, while becoming part of people’s daily lives, both in and out of work. Modern social media has become a part of everyday business, which is why companies strive to focus on social media and its use as part of their business. Social knowledge management seeks to explore this discipline, as part of a larger entity of knowledge management.

Social knowledge management is one of the application areas of social media in a business context next to others like sentiment analysis, social learning or social collaboration. Social media use by businesses can strive to achieve the following things from social media strategy point of view: learn, listen, engage in conversation, measure and refine, develop capabilities, define activities, prioritize objectives etc. Social media are not only transforming private communication and interaction, they also will transform how people work. With social media knowledge work in organizations can be optimized extremely: like a better distribution sharing and access to knowledge. This will be more and more important, as in today's business world, speed and complexity increase dramatically, while work environments change constantly .

Examples of Social KM platforms  
 Knowledge Plaza, European software application which combines social tagging, bookmarking and networking paradigms to address internal information management purposes.
 Sciomino was a startup enterprise social network for Social Knowledge Management.

Further reading 
 Gurteen, David, 2012. Leading Issues in Social Knowledge Management. A collection of important Social Knowledge Management papers. Published by Academic Publishing International. .
 Laszlo, K. C.,  Laszlo, A. (2002). Evolving knowledge for development: The role of knowledge management in a changing world. Journal of Knowledge Management, 6(4), 400-412.
 Von Krogh, G., Ishijo, K.,  Nonaka, I. (2000). Enabling knowledge creation: How to unlock the mystery of tacit knowledge and release the power of innovation. New York: Oxford University Press. 
Charles Camic, Neil Gross, and Michèle Lamont (2011). Social Knowledge in the Making. 
Kenneth E Russell, Renee La Londe, and Fred Walters (2014). Social Knowledge: Organizational Currencies in the New Knowledge Economy.

External links 
 Social Breathes New Life Into Knowledge Management For Customer Service. (Blog, Retrieved 12/18/2012 - social Knowledge Management for customer service)
 Social Knowledge Management Practice. (iTalent Social Knowledge Management)

References 

Social media